Jimmy Turgis (born 10 August 1991) is a French former professional cyclist, who rode professionally between 2014 and 2020 for the ,  and  teams. He competed in one Grand Tour during his career, the 2017 Vuelta a España. He now works as a directeur sportif for UCI ProTeam .

Major results

2009
 2nd Time trial, National Junior Road Championships
 3rd Chrono des Nations Juniors
2010
 10th Chrono des Nations Espoirs
2011
 9th Under-23 race, UCI Cyclo-cross World Championships
2012
 5th Liège–Bastogne–Liège Espoirs
2013
 1st  Young rider classification Ronde de l'Oise
 3rd Under-23 race, National Cyclo-cross Championships
 3rd Grand Prix de la ville de Pérenchies
2014
 1st  Sprints classification Tour des Pays de Savoie
 4th Ronde Pévéloise
 7th Overall Ronde de l'Oise
 8th Kattekoers
 9th Overall Tour du Limousin
2015
 10th Grand Prix de Plumelec-Morbihan
2016
 10th Cholet-Pays de Loire
2018
 9th Grand Prix de Denain
 10th Polynormande

Grand Tour general classification results timeline

References

External links

1991 births
Living people
French male cyclists
Sportspeople from Hauts-de-Seine
Cyclists from Île-de-France
People from Bourg-la-Reine